The 1977 Atlanta Falcons season was the team's 12th year in the National Football League. The team finished the season 7–7, and did not qualify for the playoffs.

Although the Falcons' offense struggled, the defense, nicknamed "Grits Blitz", was dominant. The Falcons' 129 points allowed led the league and established an all-time NFL record for fewest points allowed in a 14-game NFL season. Atlanta's 3,242 total yards allowed were second-fewest in the league, and the Falcons' 1,384 passing yards allowed was by far the best in the NFL in 1977. The defense surrendered only 9.2 points per game, which is as of the 2022 season, remains an all-time record in a 16 game season.

Offseason

NFL Draft

Personnel

Staff

Roster

Regular season

Schedule 

Note: Intra-division opponents are in bold text.

Game Summaries

Week 4 
Date: October 9
Television: CBS
Announcers: Don Criqui, Tom Matte
The Atlanta Falcons, with the NFL's leading defensive unit, have now allowed just 19 points in four games while climbing to the top of the NFC West with a 3-1 record. A 39-yard touchdown pass from Scott Hunter to Alfred Jenkins was the only score in the game and was set up when Edgar Fields blocked a punt by San Francisco's Tom Wittum.

Week 11 
Date: November 27
Television: CBS
Announcers: Bob Costas, Emerson Boozer
The Falcons had possession of the ball nine times inside Tampa Bay 40, four times as a result of turnovers. Four times they marched to the Tampa Bay 20, scoring on three possessions. Two one-yard scoring plunges by Haskel Stanback and a 26-Yard field goal by Fred Stemfort and the Falcons ran out the clock at the Tampa Bay 19 to preserve their 6th win of '77. "I was pleased with the way we controlled the ball and the clock", said coach Leeman Bennett, "Our defense we're outstanding. They went in for three plays and we're out again quite a few times".

Week 14 
Date: December 18
Television: CBS
Announcers: Lindsey Nelson, Paul Hornung
The Falcons had their most productive offensive game of the season as the Falcons scored 35 points their most in a game since they scored that many in week 10 of 1975 against the Denver Broncos. Haskel Stanback ran for 129 yards and 2 touchdowns from 2 and 7 yards while Steve Bartkowski passed for 2 touchdowns one from 27 yards to Secdrick Mclntyre and the other from 5 yards to Billy Ryckman. But the story was that the Falcons allowed the Saints to only 7 points to 129, a new NFL record for fewest points allowed by a team breaking the Minnesota Vikings' 1969's 133 points allowed. After the game the Saints fired Hank Stram as head coach.

Standings

Defensive legacy
Arguably the most famous personality on the 1977 Falcons was defensive assistant Jerry Glanville, who installed in a swarming style of play in Atlanta remembered as the "Grits Blitz" defense. Football analytics site Cold Hard Football Facts calls the 1977 Falcons "the stingiest defense of the Super Bowl Era" and "the stingiest defense since World War II." Atlanta surrendered just 9.2 points-per-game, or a total of 129 points in the 14-game season (both all-time records). Against the Falcons, teams scored 7 or fewer points in half (7) of the games, and scored more than 16 points only twice. Atlanta's defense intercepted 26 passes, allowed just nine touchdown passes, and recovered 22 fumbles.

Despite its status as the stingiest defense since the 1944 New York Giants, the Falcons sent only two defenders to the Pro Bowl in 1977: cornerback Rolland Lawrence and defensive end Claude Humphrey. The 1976 Falcons possessed one of the worst defenses in the league (22.3 PPG) and largely fell apart in 1978 (18.1 PPG), therefore making the 1977 defense a "one-hit wonder".

Awards and records

Milestones 
 Jerry Glanville's "Grits Blitz" defense set the NFL record for fewest points allowed per game since the 1970 AFL-NFL Merger (129 points on a 14-game schedule, an average of 9.2 per game).

References

External links 
 1977 Atlanta Falcons at Pro-Football-Reference.com

Atlanta Falcons
Atlanta Falcons seasons
Atlanta